"You Don't Understand Me" is a song by Swedish pop duo Roxette. Written by Per Gessle with American composer Desmond Child, it was released as the lead single from the duo's first greatest hits compilation album, Don't Bore Us, Get to the Chorus! Roxette's Greatest Hits (1995). It was also the only new song from the original edition of the album to appear on the 2000 U.S. edition. The song was a hit in several European countries, reaching the top 20 in Finland, Italy, the Netherlands, Poland, Spain, and the duo's native Sweden. The song was also a hit in Germany where, despite peaking at number 44, it would spend over three months on the German Singles Chart.

Composition and style
The song was written by Per Gessle and Desmond Child. In the Don't Bore Us, Get to the Chorus! liner notes, Per called it: "the first [Roxette] song ever to be written with someone from the 'outside'. It wasn't intended to be recorded by Roxette. Desmond came to Halmstad this summer, just to see if we could create something together. He had this idea, I changed it around a bit, and asked Marie to sing on the demo. Then I realised it suited us very well." According to Ultimate Guitar, "You Don't Understand Me" is an alternative pop ballad, with a slow tempo of 77 beats per minute. Each verse is composed of two repetitions of a C–D–Em–C–C–D–Em sequence, and the bridge consists of a Gm–B♭–F–C–B♭–F–C–B♭–F–Gm sequence. The chorus is composed of two repetitions of B♭–C–F–C sequence, with the final note amended to a Gm during the final bar.

The duo recorded acoustic versions of several songs for inclusion as b-sides on UK editions of this single. New versions of "You Don't Understand Me", "The Look" and "Listen to Your Heart", as well as a cover of The Beatles' "Help!", were recorded at Abbey Road Studios in London in early 1995, although the latter would remain unreleased until it appeared on the 2006 box set The Rox Box/Roxette 86-06.

Critical reception
Pan-European magazine Music & Media commented, "Singer Marie Frederiksson cries out as she is left in the dark by an evasive lover. A brand new, slow-stepping and dramatic ballad". A reviewer from Music Week rated it two out of five, adding that "this clumsy and half-hearted ballad is unlikely to revive the Swedish outfit's Top 10 fortunes."

Formats and track listings
All songs written by Per Gessle, except "Listen to Your Heart" music by Gessle and Mats MP Persson.

 Cassette and CD single (Australia 8651894 · Europe 8651892 · Japan TOCP-8675)
 "You Don't Understand Me" – 4:28
 "Crazy About You" – 3:57
 "Harleys & Indians (Riders in the Sky)" – 3:45

 UK Cassette and CD1 (TCEM-418 · CDEMS-418)
 "You Don't Understand Me" – 4:28
 "The Look"  – 3:46
 "Listen to Your Heart"  – 3:38
 "You Don't Understand Me"  – 3:43

 UK CD2 (CDEM-418)
 "You Don't Understand Me" – 4:28
 "Almost Unreal"  – 3:25
 "Harleys & Indians (Riders in the Sky)" – 3:45
 "The Sweet Hello, The Sad Goodbye" – 4:47

Personnel
Credits adapted from the liner notes of Don't Bore Us, Get to the Chorus! Roxette's Greatest Hits.
 Marie Fredriksson – all lead and background vocals
 Per Gessle – mixing
 Anders Herrlin – bass guitar, engineering and programming
 Michael Ilbert – engineering and mixing
 Christer Jansson – drums
 Clarence Öfwerman – keyboards, programming, production and mixing

Charts

Weekly charts

Year-end charts

"Tú No Me Comprendes" (2020)

Roxette released the Spanish-language compilation album Baladas en Español in 1996, which consisted of ballads translated by Spanish songwriter Luis Gomez-Escolar. The album was only released in Spanish and Portuguese-speaking territories. A translated version of "You Don't Understand Me", titled "Tú No Me Comprendes", was also recorded during these sessions, but was excluded from the album. Gessle explained: "We had too many songs [for Baladas en Español], so this was just hidden away somewhere."

While compiling the rarities compilation Bag of Trix in 2020, Gessle recalled recording a Spanish version of the track; the master tape of the recording was located within an EMI archival vault "in London or in Cologne". The version included on Bag of Trix is a new mix of the original recording. It was released as a single on digital and streaming platforms on 6 November 2020. This single contained their previous release, the Good Karma outtake "Let Your Heart Dance with Me", as the b-side.

Music video
A music video was created for the song, consisting of previously unseen footage from both Gessle and Fredriksson's private archives. It premiered on YouTube on 6 November.

Formats and track listings
"Tú No Me Comprendes" written by Gessle, Child and Luis Gómez Escolar; "Let Your Heart Dance with Me" written by Gessle.

 "Tú No Me Comprendes" – 4:25
 "Let Your Heart Dance with Me" – 3:07

References

1995 singles
Roxette songs
Pop ballads
Black-and-white music videos
Songs written by Per Gessle
Songs written by Desmond Child
1995 songs
1990s ballads